Doubting Thomas is a 2018 American drama film directed by Will McFadden, starring McFadden, Sarah Butler, Jamie Hector, Robert Belushi, Zach Cregger, James Morrison and Melora Walters.

Cast
 Will McFadden as Tom
 Sarah Butler as Jen
 Jamie Hector as Ron
 Robert Belushi as Alex
 Zach Cregger as Graham
 James Morrison as Bill
 Melora Walters as Kate
 Kendall Chappell as Megan
 Shaun O'Hagan as Mike Wilford
 Hustle as Daryl
 Byron Wallace as Byron
 Myke Wright as Walt
 Phil Parmet as Albright
 Alicia Blasingame as Kendall
 Chuma Gault as Officer Henderson

Release
The film was released on 11 October 2019.

Reception
John Defore of The Hollywood Reporter wrote that while the script is "uneven", the film is "open-ended enough to acknowledge that the remedies for unacknowledged prejudice are neither easy nor clearly identified."

Bobby LePire of Film Threat gave the film a score of 10/10 and wrote that the "acting is stellar, the writing is honest, and what it says about race, perception, and your true self is sincere."

Carlos Aguilar of the Los Angeles Times called the film a "mostly hackneyed lesson on racial biases desperately stumbling to appear provocative."

References

External links
 
 

American drama films
2018 drama films